The Ultralight Flight Mirage is an American ultralight aircraft that was designed by Frank Riley and produced by Ultralight Flight Inc. The aircraft was supplied as a kit for amateur construction.

Design and development
The Mirage was based on the Aerodyne Systems Vector and the Hill Humbug ultralights. It features a cable-braced high wing, a single-seat, open cockpit, tricycle landing gear and a single engine in pusher configuration.

The aircraft is made from aluminum tubing, with the flying surfaces covered in Dacron sailcloth. Its double-surfaced  span wing is cable-braced from an inverted "V" kingpost and features spoilers. The pilot is accommodated on an open seat without a windshield. A fiberglass cockpit fairing was optional. The landing gear includes suspension on all three wheels and nosewheel steering. The Kawasaki TA 440A engine installation was unusual, although similar to the Humbug and the Vector. The engine is mounted at the leading edge of the wing and drives the trailing edge-mounted pusher propeller through an extension shaft. The driveshaft has proven troublesome in operational use and requires regular maintenance.

The Mirage design suffers from cracks in the aluminum wing-mounting brackets at the root tube junction and many have been changed to stainless steel fittings instead.

Specifications (Mirage)

References

External links
Photo of Mirage in flight

1980s United States ultralight aircraft
Homebuilt aircraft
Single-engined pusher aircraft